United Nations Security Council Resolution 1750 was unanimously adopted on 30 March 2007.

Resolution 
The Security Council this morning extended the mandate of the United Nations Mission in Liberia (UNMIL), which was to expire tomorrow at midnight, until 30 September, while requesting the Secretary-General to present a detailed drawdown plan for the operation no later than 45 days before mandate expiration.

Unanimously adopting resolution 1750 (2007), the Council further decided to include an additional element to UNMIL’s mandate, by providing administrative and related support and security for activities conducted in Liberia by the Special Court for Sierra Leone.  Those activities would be carried out on a cost-reimbursable basis and with the consent of the Government of Liberia.

See also 
List of United Nations Security Council Resolutions 1701 to 1800 (2006–2008)

References

External links
Text of the Resolution at undocs.org

 1750
 1750
March 2007 events
2007 in Liberia